Edward Poole (c. 1530 – 1578) was the member of the Parliament of England for Malmesbury for the parliament of 1563. He was a member of the family of Pooles in Oaksey who were a branch of the Pooles of Sapperton, Gloucestershire.

References 

Members of the Parliament of England for Malmesbury
English MPs 1563–1567
Year of birth uncertain
1530s births
1578 deaths